My Effortless Brilliance is a 2008 independent dark comedy film directed by Lynn Shelton and starring Basil Harris, Sean Nelson, Jeanette Maus, and Calvin Reeder, all of whom co-wrote the film. The film was shot by cinematographer Benjamin Kasulke.

The film screened at such film festivals as South by Southwest and Maryland Film Festival, and was released on DVD by IFC Films in November 2009.

External links 
 

American comedy films
2008 comedy films
2008 films
Films directed by Lynn Shelton
2000s American films